Acacia crombiei, commonly known as pink gidgee, is a shrub belonging to the genus Acacia and the subgenus Phyllodineae that is native to central Queensland.

Description
It has glabrous, flexuose, angled branchlets with no stipules. The straight to shallowly recurved pale-green phyllodes have a narrowly linear shape. The inflorescences appear in groups of one to four and have spherical flower-heads. The shiny dark-brown seeds within are flat with an oblong to widely elliptic shape.

Distribution
The tree has only a small and series of isolated populations around the small town of Muttaburra to around Elmore Station in an arid part of central Queensland. It is usually part of on wooded downs or in open woodland communities often associated with Acacia cambagei and Atalaya hemiglauca growing in alluvial soils over and around sandstone and basalt. It was declared as vulnerable in accordance with the Environment Protection and Biodiversity Conservation Act 1999 in 2008.

See also
 List of Acacia species

References

crombiei
Flora of Queensland
Plants described in 1942